Knoxville Catholic High School is a private, Roman Catholic high school in Knoxville, Tennessee. It is located within the Roman Catholic Diocese of Knoxville.

History
Knoxville Catholic High School, originally located on East Magnolia Avenue, registered 98 young men and women in 1932. The faculty was composed of four Sisters of Mercy and two lay teachers. The Reverend Christopher P. Murray was appointed director of Knoxville Catholic High School in 1941.

Under the direction of Father Murray, additional space was added including a gymnasium-auditorium, dressing rooms, showers, and a science laboratory. In 1947, Knoxville Catholic High School, often referred to by the acronym KCHS, became an accredited member of the Southern Association of Colleges and Secondary Schools.

March 1951 saw the breaking of ground for another addition. The new building included five classrooms, a library, offices, lavatories, and an addition to the gymnasium. Space was made for a cafeteria and a chapel.

The campus provided fields for softball, basketball, and other sports. Father Herbert Prescott became the first priest-principal of Knoxville Catholic High School in 1962. Father John Batson was named principal in 1965 and Father Xavier Mankel in 1967. Mankel had a long and distinguished career helping to monitor and guide the growth and development of KCHS until 1979.

Father Michael Johnston was appointed as the fourth priest-principal to serve KCHS in 1979. Father Frank Richards followed in 1982. At this time the School Board of KCHS began to organize a major capital Fund Raising Campaign to ensure the future of the private, Catholic school located in Knoxville, Tennessee. Father G. Patrick Garrity arrived as principal in 1985.

Enrollment continued to increase over the next several years and with it a growth of faculty. The decision to move KCHS to a new facility was announced in February 1997. After almost seven decades on Magnolia Avenue, Knoxville Catholic High School would be moving to the Cedar Bluff area in West Knoxville. In July 1997, Philip Dampf became the principal of KCHS and he oversaw the school's move to West Knoxville.

By January 2000, the construction of new facilities was complete. Knoxville Catholic High School relocated to 9245 Fox Lonas Road and was dedicated by Bishop Joseph E. Kurtz on January 3, 2000. In 2001, Dampf resigned and Aurelia Montgomery was appointed as Interim Principal. After the successful completion of a $1 million campaign, KCHS announced the building of an All Sports Complex. The construction of the All Sports Complex was completed in 2002 with the goal of accommodating the growing athletic programs for KCHS.

In 2004, Montgomery retired as Interim Principal and the search committee found a successful candidate in Dickie Sompayrac, who began his tenure as KCHS principal in 2005. Also in 2005 a new Performing Arts Center was built and dedicated, providing space for the performing arts. 

In November 2006, Catholic High launched a three-phased Living our Mission through Growth Capital Campaign.

On January 6, 2008, KCHS celebrated the completion of a new wing with a blessing ceremony performed Reverend Al Humbrecht. The expansion was the first phase of the school's capital campaign and added ten classrooms, a guidance suite, and additional parking to the campus. Reverend Chris Michelson, Pastor of St. Albert the Great and Capital Campaign Chair, announced the wing would be dedicated as Schaad Hall.

With a donation to the school's endowment from the late Isabel Ashe Bonnyman ‘39, Knoxville Catholic High School was able to complete the second phase of the campaign and provide the school with a solid financial foundation. Faris Field House was named for John and Sondra Faris and completed the school's capital effort. It added 8,000 square feet of weight training facilities, athletic offices, locker rooms, and storage for the Catholic school's growing boys' and girls' fitness programs.

On February 22, 2021, Knoxville Catholic broke ground on the St. Gregory the Great Auditorium and announced the “Setting The Stage” fundraising campaign. Expected completion date is late spring 2022.

Academics

KCHS is a member of the National Catholic Education Association and accredited by:

 Tennessee Department of Education
 Southern Association of Colleges and Schools
 Roman Catholic Diocese of Knoxville

Sports

The mascot of Knoxville Catholic High School is the Fighting Irish. The school colors are green and gold.

Football
The Fighting Irish have won three state championships and been state runners-up once more. In 2008, under the direction of head coach Mark Pemberton the Fighting Irish had a perfect 15–0 season and defeated Memphis Mitchell in the state championship game 28–18. In 2015, head coach Steve Matthews led the Irish to an 11–4 record and the school's second ever state title after besting Pearl-Cohn 48–8. In 2017, Matthews became the first Knoxville Catholic football coach to win multiple state titles, guiding the Irish to a 12–3 record and a 45–28 victory over Beech in the state championship contest.

The Irish have had eight TSSAA Mr. Football winners: Rob Demastus (Division II Class A back of the year in 1999), Jeremy Bentley (Division II Class A/AA lineman of the year in 2003), Nick McFadden (Division II Class A/AA back of the year in 2004), Harrison Smith (Division I Class 3A back of the year in 2006), Daniel Hood (Division I Class 3A lineman of the year in 2008), Kyler Kerbyson (Division 1 Class 3A lineman of the year in 2010), Amari Rodgers (Division I Class 4A back of the year 2015 & 2016), and Cade Mays (Division I Class 4A lineman of the year 2016 & 2017). Harrison Smith was also named the Gatorade Player of the Year for Tennessee in 2006.

State Titles
Knoxville Catholic has won 42 team and individual TSSAA state championships.

 Boys' Basketball: 2020
 Boys' Cross Country: 2015, 2016, 2018
 Girls' Cross Country: 2009, 2010, 2019
 Football: 2008, 2015, 2017
 Boys' Golf: 2016
 Boys' Soccer: 2008
 Girls' Soccer: 2013, 2014
 Boys' Tennis: 2008, 2009, 2014, 2015
 Girls' Tennis: 2016, 2017, 2021, 2022
 Boys' Track & Field: 1967, 1990, 2007, 2014, 2015, 2016, 2017, 2018, 2019
 Girls' Track & Field: 1994, 2006, 2009, 2010, 2011, 2012, 2014, 2018
 Girls' Volleyball: 2016, 2021
 Wrestling: 1995

Notable alumni
Jeff Faris, Tight Ends Coach at University of California, Los Angeles
Briston Maroney, singer, songwriter, and guitarist (2016)
Cade Mays, offensive lineman with the Carolina Panthers (2018)
Cooper Mays, offensive lineman at the Tennessee Volunteers (2020)
Cormac McCarthy, Pulitzer Prize winning novelist and author of The Road (1951)
Brian Metz, Tight Ends Coach at Ohio University (2009)
Amari Rodgers, wide receiver for the Green Bay Packers (2017)
Harrison Smith, Pro Bowl NFL safety for the Minnesota Vikings (2007)

References

External links
 Official site

Educational institutions established in 1932
Roman Catholic Diocese of Knoxville
Catholic secondary schools in Tennessee
Schools in Knoxville, Tennessee
1932 establishments in Tennessee